The European Arboricultural Council (EAC) based in Bad Honnef, Germany is a forum where delegates from a wide range of arboricultural organizations throughout Europe meet. The goal of the EAC is to elevate the status and to raise the professional level of competence within arboriculture. This objective is carried out by liaising on matters ranging from research and education to successful tree establishment and the improvement of safe working practices.

Objectives 

The EAC coordinates and represents the interests of the European arboriculture towards appropriate governing bodies and individuals in order to achieve improvements in the fields of:

	The profession of Arboriculture
	Research on urban trees
	tree planting in urban conditions
	Education and training in Arboriculture
	Safe working practices
	Tree management
	Disease and pest control
	Harmonization in tree care procedures in Europe

Working groups 

The EAC is divided into following working groups:

	Education and Certification with WG Exam Rules, WG Certification and Quality Management and WG Question Bank
       Publications with WG EAC Planting Guide, EAC Safety Guide, EAC Pruning Guide and EAC European Tree Worker Handbook
       Public Relations and Marketing with WG ECOT-Award (European City of Trees)

Members 

Following countries are members of the European Arboriculture Council:

	Austria
	ISA-Austria
	Belgium
	Belgian Arborists Associations (BAAs)
       Bulgaria
Bulgarian Arborist Association
	Croatia
	Croatian Arboricultural Council / Hrvatska udruga za Arborikulturu (HUA)
	Czech Republic
	Czech Tree Care Society
	Denmark
	Dansk Traplejeforening
	Finland
	Finnish Tree Care Association
       Germany
Interessenvertretung Deutsche Baumpflege - Germany
       Greece
Hellenic Association for Arboriculture - Greece
	Italy
	ISA Italiano
	Latvia
	Latvijas Kokkopju-Arboristu Biedriba
       Lithuania
Lithuanian arboricultural center (LAC)

Lithuanian Arborists Association (LARA)
	Netherlands
	VHG Vakgroep Boomverzorging
	Norway
	Norsk Trepleie Forum
	Poland
	Polish Arboricultural Council and Miedzynarodowe Towarzystwo Uprawy i Ochrony Drzew (MTUiOD)
	Portugal
	Sociedade de Ciencias Agrarias de Portugal (SCAP)
	Russia
	Guild of Professionals in Landscape Industry (GPLI) and ZDOROVY LES NPSA       
       Serbia
Society of Landscape Horticulture of Serbia
	Slovakia
	ISA Slovensko
	Spain
	Asociación Española de Arboricultura (AEA)
	Sweden
	Svenska Trädföreningen
	Switzerland
	Bund Schweizer Baumpflege
	United Kingdom
	The Arboricultural Association

External links 
 ISA-Austria
 Interessenvertretung Deutsche Baumpflege (IDB) c/o BGL
 ISA Italiano
 VHG Vakgroep Boomverzorging
 Norsk Trepleie Forum
 Bund Schweizer Baumpflege
 Asociación Española de Arboricultura (AEA)
 Arboricultural Association
 Svenska Trädföreningen (ST)

Sources 
 Official Webpage

Forestry in Europe
International forestry organizations
Urban forestry organizations